A list of musical instruments referenced in fiction which do not exist in reality:

Animal instruments
The Cat Organ is a hypothetical musical instrument that consists of a line of cats fixed in place with their tails stretched out underneath a keyboard so that they cry out when a key is pressed. The cats would be arranged according to the natural tone of their voices. The Piganino is a similar instrument, that employs pigs for the same purpose. Marvin Suggs, a character from The Muppet Show plays an equivalent Muppaphone, while the fictional character Ken Ewing performs with his Musical Mice in a Monty Python sketch.

Baliset
In the Dune universe, the baliset is a very long nine-stringed zither. In the 1984 film Dune, the baliset role is filled by a cosmetically altered Chapman stick.

Gaffophone
The Gaffophone is an instrument invented by Gaston Lagaffe in André Franquin's eponymous comics series. It looks like a giant harp with a large horn attached to it and is known for making atrocious noise that makes people and animals run away and buildings collapse. Franquin used it in numerous gags.

Glübalübalum
The glübalübalum is an instrument invented by Tonker Cassands in Margery Allingham's Campion novel The Beckoning Lady.  Made from perspex with rubber bladders it is described in the book as  "a very long tube with an immense horn at one end and a cork at the other. In between there were, so to speak, digressions."

Harolina
In the Redwall series of fantasy books, the harolina is a type of stringed instrument played by the anthropomorphic hares of the series.

Holophonor
In the animated series Futurama, the holophonor, played by Fry, is based on the Visi-Sonor and appears in episodes "Parasites Lost" and "The Devil's Hands are Idle Playthings"

Ressikan flute
In the Star Trek universe, the ressikan flute is a musical instrument played by Captain Picard.  The instrument is an artifact discovered on a probe sent out by the former residents of Kataan.

Visi-Sonor
The Visi-Sonor appears in the Isaac Asimov book, Foundation and Empire. The fictional musical instrument stimulates brain cells and causes imagined lights, sounds and emotions directly:
"His long fingers caressed softly and slowly, pressing lightly on contacts with a rippling motion, resting themselves momentarily on one key then another – and in the air before them there was a soft glowing rosiness, just inside the range of vision."

With the Mule's great power, the Visi-Sonor became a killing device later in the book.

References

Fictional